Coon Island Township is one of ten townships in Butler County, Missouri, USA.  As of the 2010 census, its population was 187.

Geography
It contains one cemetery, Coon Island.

Allred Lake is within this township. The streams of Big Hunting Slough, Caney Slough and Little Hunting Slough run through this township.

References

External links
 US-Counties.com
 City-Data.com

Townships in Butler County, Missouri
Townships in Missouri